The Nikon Z fc, announced on 29 June 2021 and scheduled for release in July 2021, is a mirrorless interchangeable-lens camera with the Nikon Z-mount with a MSRP of $960.

It is based on the DX-format Nikon Z 50 and has a classic design with diagonal controls, similar to the Nikon FM2, an F-mount film camera launched in 1982. The body is made from magnesium alloy and carbon composite materials. The set includes a Nikkor Z 28mm ƒ/2.8 lens (Special Edition) designed to match the body.

The name "fc" is taken from the "f," which represents the fusion of Nikon's history and technology, and the "c," which represents the casual use of a camera with a classic design. On 2 July 2021, Nikon announced that the Z fc "may not be available by the launch date due to higher than expected reservations".

The Z fc has won the Camera Grand Prix 2022 Editors Choice R&D Award.

See also
Nikon Df

References

External links

Z fc
Z fc
Cameras introduced in 2021